Gleb Kolyadin (Gleb Alekseevich Kolyadin, born July 11, 1989, Leningrad, Russia) is a Russian pianist, composer, and arranger who mixes progressive rock and jazz fusion with neoclassical styles. He has released music both as a solo artist and as a member of the prog duo iamthemorning.

Biography
Gleb Kolyadin was born on July 11, 1989 in the Soviet city of Leningrad (now Saint Petersburg). He studied classical piano at the Saint Petersburg Conservatory under Professor Vladimir Polyakov, graduating in 2015. Since 2010, he has been the composer and pianist of the two-piece progressive rock group iamthemorning, which won Prog magazine's "Album of the Year" at the Progressive Music Awards in 2016.

Kolyadin has played many concerts in Russia and Europe since 2011, collaborating with musicians and artists such as Árstíðir (Iceland), Gazpacho (Norway), Balmorhea (USA), Djivan Gasparyan (Armenia), and Riverside (Poland). He joined the tango ensemble Orquesta Primavera in 2013, which was the ensemble behind the first regular Russian milonga with live music - "Milonga la Primavera".

Kolyadin started composing music for theatrical performances in 2015, and has written works for the Alexandrinsky Theatre, the Saint Petersburg Comedy Theatre, and the Volkov Theatre in Yaroslavl, as well as the projection show Así es Michoacán (Mexico). He is an active performer in the world of modern classical music, and has played the Russian debuts of many compositions, including Textures by Paul Lansky, 2×5 by Steve Reich, Tubular Bells II by Mike Oldfield, and more.

In 2018, he released his first solo album Gleb Kolyadin on the British label Kscope. A number of prominent prog musicians participated in the recording: drummer Gavin Harrison (King Crimson, Porcupine Tree), bass player Nick Beggs and saxophonist Theo Travis of Steven Wilson's solo band, keyboardist Jordan Rudess (Dream Theater), and vocalists Steve Hogarth (Marillion) and Mick Moss (Antimatter). The album ranked 15th in Prog magazine's Top 50 2018 albums list and was shortlisted for the Progressive Music Awards in two categories – Album of the Year and International Band/Artist of the Year.

As part of the project Eidolon, Kolyadin recorded music for an exhibition of works by artist Arseny Blinov, held at the New Stage of the Alexandrinsky Theater. He has recorded with the band The Grand Astoria and has recorded several compositions by Dmitry Maksimachev. In 2018, Kolyadin was a guest musician on the song "Prayers of the Dead" by Bi-2 and Boris Grebenshchikov. In the summer of 2019, he was a composer on Diana Vishneva's Context Project.

In 2019 and 2020 Kolyadin was voted best keyboardist of the year by readers of Prog magazine.

Kolyadin's Three Miniatures with the string arrangement by Grigory Losenkov was performed by OpensoundOrchestra on December 1, 2020, at the Zaryadye Concert Hall in Moscow as a part of the "PULSE" concert series featuring works by contemporary composers and important works of the turn of the XX-XXI centuries.

On March 26, 2021, he released his second solo project water movements as a means of funding his third album "the Outland" (released in November 2022).

Discography

Gleb Kolyadin 
 Gleb Kolyadin (2018)
water movements (2021)
the Outland (2022)

Iamthemorning 
 ~ (2012)
 Miscellany (EP) (2014)
 Belighted (2014)
 From the House of Arts (Live) (2015)
 Lighthouse (2016)
 Ocean Sounds (Blu-Ray) (2018)
 The Bell (2019)
 Counting the Ghosts (EP) (2020)

poloniumcubes 
 one (EP) (2014)
 two (EP) (2015)
 three (EP) (2015)
 music for Arseny Blinov’s abstract art (EP) (2018)
 four (EP) (2018)
five (OST) (2019)
six (2020)
seven (2020)

Music for theatre 
 Shirley Valentine (2016, Saint Petersburg Comedy Theatre, directed by Andrzej Bubien)
 Amadeus (2017, Omsk Academic Drama Theatre, directed by Andrzej Bubien)
 Six Characters in Search of an Author (2018, Russian State Academic Drama Theatre n.a. Fyodor Volkov, Yaroslavl, directed by Andrzej Bubien)
 Contact (2019, ballet, New Stage of the Alexandrinsky Theatre, choreographer Ernest Nurgali)
 The Seven Who Were Hanged, (2019, Educational Theater of the Russian State Institute for the Arts, directed by Andrzej Bubien)
 Forest (2019, ballet, Hermitage Theatre, choreographer Ernest Nurgali)
 Visit of the Lady (2020, Omsk Academic Drama Theatre, directed by Andrzej Bubien)
 Fox PEACE (2020, Theatre TSEKH, directed by Yulia Kalandarishvili)
 Wolves and Sheep (2020, The Baltic House Festival Theatre, directed by Andrzej Bubien)
 The Kiss of Irukandji (2021, Arkhangelsk Youth Theater of V.P. Panov, directed by Yulia Kalandarishvili)
 Fathers and Sons (2021, Russian State Academic Drama Theatre n.a. Fyodor Volkov, Yaroslavl, directed by Andrzej Bubien)

External links
 Official website

References

1989 births
Living people
Progressive rock keyboardists
Musicians from Saint Petersburg